Yvonne Hubert (28 May 18958 June 1988) was a Belgian-born Canadian pianist and pedagogue. Considered one of the most eminent professors of Canada, for her strong personality, inexhaustible energy and exceptional quality of her teaching, Yvonne Hubert deeply influenced her students by giving them a strong technical background, and so enriched musical life in Montreal and Canada.

Biography
Hubert was born in Mouscron, Belgium in 1895.  She began her musical studies at the Conservatory of Lille, where she won the first prize for piano in 1906.  Her remarkable talent attracted the attention of Alfred Cortot, André Gedalge, Egon Petri, and Gabriel Fauré. She enrolled at the Paris Conservatoire in 1906, first studying piano with Marguerite Long and later in 1908, with Alfred Cortot. She also studied chamber music with Camille Chevillard and theory with Maurice Emmanuel. She won first prize for piano at the Paris Conservatoire in 1911.

Under the tutelage of Fauré, who entrusted her with the first performances of several of his works, she began a career as a soloist and chamber musician in France, Belgium, Canada and the United States, and also accompanied her brother, cellist Marcel Hubert.

In 1926, she moved to Montreal and in 1929 and founded the Alfred Cortot School of Piano, to promote the French tradition, and in particular the method of Cortot.

From 1945 to 1970 she taught at the Conservatoire de Musique de Montréal. She also taught at the École de musique Vincent d'Indy from 1952 to 1979.

Her students, many of whom have won national and international competitions, included: Henri Brassard, Philip Cohen, André Laplante, Michel Dussault, Marc Durand, Janina Fialkowska, Lorraine Prieur, William Tritt, Louis Lortie, Marc-André Hamelin, Claude Labelle, Gérald Lévesque, Kenneth Gilbert, Suzanne Blondin, Suzanne Goyette, Serge Garant, Gilles Manny and Ronald Turini.

Honours

 1979 - Medal of the Canadian Music Council
 1979 - Honorary Diploma of the Canadian Conference of the Arts
 1981 - Honorary LLD from Concordia University, Montreal
 1987 - Price Calixa-Lavallée
 1989 - The Place des Arts named its largest rehearsal room in her honour.

References

1895 births
1988 deaths
Conservatoire de Paris alumni
Belgian classical pianists
Canadian classical pianists
Canadian women pianists
Canadian music educators
Piano pedagogues
People from Mouscron
20th-century classical pianists
20th-century Canadian pianists
Belgian women musicians
Women music educators
Women classical pianists
20th-century Canadian women musicians
Belgian emigrants to Canada
20th-century women pianists